The 1st Chicago Film Critics Association Awards were announced in 1989. The awards were compiled by CFCA founders Sue Kiner and Sharon LeMaire with the help of Chicago's television, radio and print film critics. There was no awards ceremony that year.

Winners
The winners of the 1st Chicago Film Critics Association Awards are as follows:

Best Actor
Jeremy Irons – Dead Ringers

Best Actress
Barbara Hershey – Shy People

Best Director
Robert Zemeckis – Who Framed Roger Rabbit

Best Film
Mississippi Burning

Best Foreign Film
Au revoir les enfants

Best Supporting Actor 
Martin Landau – Tucker: The Man and His Dream

Best Supporting Actress 
Frances McDormand – Mississippi Burning

Most Promising Actor 
Eric Bogosian – Talk Radio

Most Promising Actress 
Glenne Headly – Dirty Rotten Scoundrels

References

External links
1988 Awards at the Internet Movie Database

Chicago Film Critics Association Awards
1988 film awards